The Rural Municipality of Leroy No. 339 is a rural municipality (RM) in the Canadian province of Saskatchewan within Census Division No. 10 and  Division No. 5. It is located east of Saskatoon.

History 
The RM of Roach No. 339 was originally incorporated as a rural municipality on January 1, 1913. Its name was changed to the RM of Ayr No. 339 on March 14, 1914 and then renamed again to the RM of Leroy No. 339 on February 27, 1931.

Geography

Communities and localities 
The following urban municipalities are surrounded by the RM.

Towns
 Leroy

The following unincorporated communities are within the RM.

Localities
 Romance
 Shady Grove
 Sinnett

Demographics 

Government 
The RM of Leroy No. 339 is governed by an elected municipal council and an appointed administrator that meets on the second Wednesday of every month. The reeve of the RM is Calvin Buhs while its administrator is Wendy Gowda. The RM's office is located in Leroy.

Transportation 
Rail
Lanigan - Naicam Branch  C.P.R -- serves Lanigan, Sinnett, Leroy, Romance, Watson, Daphne, Spalding

Roads
Highway 761 -- East west highway through RM
Highway 667 -- serves Jansen, Saskatchewan and St. Gregor, Saskatchewan north/south through the RM

See also 
List of rural municipalities in Saskatchewan

References 

Leroy

Division No. 10, Saskatchewan